Julie Saul (December 31, 1954 – February 4, 2022) was an American gallerist. She founded her gallery, Julie Saul Projects, in 1986. The gallery is a major exhibitor of traditional and avant-garde contemporary photography. Saul was born in Tampa, Florida. She died from leukemia on February 4, 2022, in Tampa, Florida, at the age of 67.

References

1954 births
2022 deaths
Businesspeople from Tampa, Florida
20th-century American women
21st-century American women
Deaths from cancer in Florida
Deaths from leukemia